John Dunning (born November 6, 1950) is an American volleyball coach who was the head women's coach at Stanford University (2001–2016) and the University of the Pacific (United States) (1985–2000). In 32 seasons of collegiate coaching, he guided his teams to five NCAA championships – second most of any Division I women's volleyball coach – and compiled an overall record of 888-185 (.828). He is one of only two Division I college volleyball coaches to have won NCAA championships at two different schools.

Early years 
Dunning didn't play volleyball but came to the sport first as a high school coach.   Before taking the position at the University of the Pacific, Dunning taught math and coached both basketball and volleyball at Fremont High School in Sunnyvale, California. His volleyball teams compiled a record of 283–32 (.898) and won six CIF-Central Coast Section championships as well as a California state championship (1980). 

In 1980, Dunning founded Bay Club, a USA Volleyball junior club. His 17-and-under team won the national championship at USA Volleyball Nationals in 1984.

College coaching

University of the Pacific (United States) (1985–2000) 
At UOP, Dunning led the Tigers to two NCAA championships (1985, 1986), a runner-up national finish (1990), five Big West Conference championships and 16 consecutive NCAA tournament appearances, where his teams compiled a postseason record of 43–15.

Dunning was named Big West Coach of the Year four times while at UOP and was inducted into the University of the Pacific Hall of Fame in 2007. He coached 16 All Americans at UOP, including two-time Olympian Elaina Oden and 2008 Olympian Jennifer Joines.

Stanford University (2001–2016) 

In 16 seasons as Stanford's head coach, Dunning guided the Cardinal to three NCAA championships (2001, 2004, 2016), a 58–13 record in the NCAA tournament and seven national championship match appearances. He was inducted into the AVCA Hall of Fame in 2011, chosen the AVCA National Coach of the Year in 2001 and 2016 and shares the NCAA Division I record for coaching in the most women's volleyball championship matches (10) with Penn State coach Russ Rose. Dunning announced his retirement on January 9, 2017.

Dunning coached 52 AVCA All Americans at Stanford, including four-time Olympian Logan Tom, who was a two-time AVCA National Player of the Year at Stanford, two-time Olympian Ogonna Nnamani, winner of the Honda-Broderick Cup in 2004 as the NCAA's top female athlete, and two-time Olympian Foluke Akinradewo, the AVCA Player of the Year in 2007 and the “Best Middle Blocker” at the 2016 Summer Olympics in Rio de Janeiro.

Coaching education 
In 2011, Dunning partnered with three-time USA Olympic volleyball coach Terry Liskevych and Penn State University women's volleyball coach Russ Rose to create The Art of Coaching Volleyball (AOCVB), an educational organization that teaches coaching methodology through clinics and online resources. Since its founding, AOCVB has put on 43 clinics in 31 cities and created an online library with more than 3,000 video tutorials.

Year-by-year career record

Honors and awards 

 AVCA National Coach of the Year: 2001, 2016
 AVCA Hall of Fame: 2011 induction 
 University of the Pacific Hall of Fame: 2007 induction
 Pac-12 Coach of the Year: 2001, 2007, 2008, 2012
 USA Volleyball All-Time Great Coach Award: 2005
 Big West Coach of the Year: 1986, 1996, 1999, 2000
 Volleyball Monthly National Coach of the Year: 1985
 California Coaches Association Prep Coach of the Year: 1980
 San Jose Sports Hall of Fame: 2019 induction

Personal 
Dunning and his wife, Julie, have two daughters, Lauren and Lisa, and two grandchildren, McKenzie and Cole.

Education 
Dunning earned a Bachelor of Arts in Mathematics and Economics from San Diego State University in 1973.

References 

American volleyball coaches
1950 births
Living people
Pacific Tigers women's volleyball coaches
 Stanford Cardinal women's volleyball coaches
 People from Reno, Nevada
 San Diego State University alumni